The ninth Central American and Caribbean Games were held in Kingston, the capital city of Jamaica from August 15 to August 28, 1962. This games included 1,559 athletes from fifteen nations. It took place days after the country had gained independence from the United Kingdom. It is the first and so far only Central American and Caribbean Games to be held in a non-Spanish-speaking country.

Sports

References
 Meta
 

 
Central American and Caribbean Games, 1962
Central American and Caribbean Games
Central American and Caribbean Games, 1962
1962 in Jamaican sport
1962 in Caribbean sport
1962 in Central American sport
Multi-sport events in Jamaica
20th century in Kingston, Jamaica